Daniel Bilalian (born 10 April 1947) is a French journalist, news anchor and television presenter.

Life and career 
Daniel Bilalian was born in Paris and is of Armenian descent. After studying law, he became a journalist at the Union de Reims. Since 1971, he is a regional correspondent for the ORTF, before joining the national redaction staff of Antenne 2, where he became a main reporter before presenting Antenne 2 midi. He presented some daily news in 1976.

He presented the Journal de 13 heures from 1979 to 1981 and went back to Antenne 2 midi in 1982 before presenting in 1985 the Journal de 20 heures alternatively with Bernard Rapp. He was then replaced a few months later by Claude Sérillon. After being absent for two years, he came back in 1987 to present the daily news on weekends until 1990. He also presented Stars à la barre and then Dossiers de l'écran, retitled Mardi Soir, before being ousted in 1991 after a political debate.

He returned on presenting the daily news on France 2 in 1994 on the Journal de 13 heures replacing Henri Sannier gone to present the Soir 3. In September 1995, he became the presenter of the Journal de 20 heures alternating with Bruno Masure. After his departure of this one in September 1997, he presented the daily news during the week while Béatrice Schönberg presented on weekends. He is replaced by Claude Sérillon in August 1998. After an absence, he came back once again to present the Journal de 13 heures from September 2001 to July 2004.

In July 2004, he was named sports director of France Télévisions. In 2005, the ouster of Pierre Salviac surprises the rugby section of the sports service, and in 2009 the one of its successor. In January 2010, the sports journalists challenged on changing the editorial and management methods that were judged dangerous. In April 2010, the majority voted the mistrust against him, reporting his management and reproaching him not working on the redaction.

Personal life 
Married in 1972 to Christine, he has one daughter named Marguerite, born in 1975.

Daniel Bilalian has one brother named Gérard.

Bibliography

Distinctions 
In July 2005, Daniel Bilalian was honoured Chevalier de la Légion d'honneur.

See also 
List of newsreaders and journalists in France

References 

1947 births
Journalists from Paris
French television presenters
French people of Armenian descent
Chevaliers of the Légion d'honneur
Living people
French male non-fiction writers